The 1946 Idaho gubernatorial election was held on November 5. Republican nominee C. A. Robins defeated Democratic incumbent Arnold Williams with 56.37% of the vote.

Idaho changed the term for governor from two to four years starting with this election, and the winner was not allowed to run for a second term (self-succession) until 1958. Williams had become governor in November 1945, following the resignation of Charles Gossett, whom Williams immediately appointed to the U.S. Senate.

Primary elections
Primary elections were held on June 11, 1946.

Democratic primary

Candidates
Arnold Williams, St. Anthony, incumbent governor
Franklin Girard, Coeur d'Alene, former secretary of state
Asher Wilson, Twin Falls, state board of education member

Republican primary

Candidates
C. A. Robins, St. Maries physician, state senator
C. A. Bottolfsen, Arco newspaper publisher and farmer, former governor
Adam Blackstone, Marsing rancher, county commissioner

General election

Candidates
C. A. Robins, Republican 
Arnold Williams, Democratic

Results

References

1946
Idaho
Gubernatorial